Fibrosing colonopathy is a disease that arises in people with cystic fibrosis treated with high doses of pancreatic enzyme supplements. Symptoms are non-specific with abdominal pain, abdominal swelling, vomiting, and constipation.

Risk factors include being young, prior surgery of the intestines, and the use of certain medications including corticosteroids and H2 blockers. It may appear similar to distal intestinal obstruction syndrome or inflammatory colitis such as Crohn's disease.

A maximum dose of 10,000 IU of lipase per kilogram per day is recommended for pancreatic enzyme supplementation to prevent this condition. More than 60 cases have been described as of 1999. The disease was suggested to be caused by methacrylic acid copolymer which is used as coating for delayed release of enzymes but there is no reliable evidence for that.

References 

Gastrointestinal tract disorders
Cystic fibrosis